Sir Samuel Hardman Lever, 1st Baronet, KCB (18 April 1869 – 1 July 1947), generally known as Sir Hardman Lever, and as "Sammie" to his friends, was an English accountant and civil servant.

Lever was born in Bootle, Lancashire, and was educated at Merchant Taylors' School. He qualified as a chartered accountant in 1890. He worked as an accountant in Liverpool, New York City and London.

In August 1915, he was appointed Assistant Financial Secretary at the Ministry of Munitions, where he was in charge of contracts and finance. At the end of 1916, he was appointed Financial Secretary to the Treasury, usually a political office, and nominally held the post until 1921. From 1917 he held the post jointly with Stanley Baldwin and after 1919 left most of the duties to the latter.

He also served as an Assistant Commissioner for Finance in the United States, 1917–1918, Treasury Representative at the Ministry of Transport, 1919–1921, a member of Weir Committee on Electricity which led to the establishment of the National Grid, and Chairman of the Telegraph Committee of Enquiry. He also headed Air Missions to Canada in 1938, and to Australia and New Zealand in 1939.

He was knighted as Knight Commander of the Order of the Bath (KCB) in 1917 and created a baronet in the 1920 New Year Honours. He was also awarded the Legion of Honour and the Order of the Crown of Italy.

He is buried with his wife, Edythe, in the churchyard of St Mary's, Kings Worthy, Winchester, Hampshire.

Footnotes

1869 births
1947 deaths
People from Bootle
People educated at Merchant Taylors' Boys' School, Crosby
Baronets in the Baronetage of the United Kingdom
Knights Commander of the Order of the Bath
English accountants
English civil servants
Civil servants in the Ministry of Munitions
Civil servants in HM Treasury
Members of HM Government Finance Service